The Letran Knights basketball is the collegiate men’s basketball program of the Colegio de San Juan de Letran. The Knights have won 20 championships since joining the National Collegiate Athletic Association (NCAA). It is the second winningest team in the NCAA, just behind the San Beda Red Lions. The current head coach of the Knights is Bonnie Tan.

History

Pre-war: first championship 
The Letran basketball team found its humble beginnings in Liga Catolica until the 1920s. Letran then joined the NCAA in 1928. Letran College withdrew, however, in 1933, after a dispute over a decision of one of its team member during the Letran-Ateneo basketball game. Letran then later rejoined the league in 1936. Two years later, the Knights won their first senior basketball title under coach Jacinto Ciria Cruz and team captain Felicisimo Fajardo by beating San Beda, 42-30. The other members of the victorious 1938 quintet were Angel de Leon, Guillermo Salvador, Feliciano Manlulu, Carlos Camillas, Jose Pacheco, Honesto Baltazar, Francisco Nepomuceno, Victorio Salazar, German Monzon and Guillermo Mendoza.

1950–1980: after the war 
The Knights emerged as the top team in 1950. Dubbed as the Letran Murder Inc., Letran could have won the NCAA title by a sweep, but it was beaten by underdog San Beda in the final game of the tournament. The team was coached by Angel de Leon and led by 1948 Olympian Lauro "The Fox" Mumar.

During this period, the Knights made a habit of winning championships around the turn of every decade. In 1960 the team, which were led by Clemente Bargas, Augusto Cepeda, bigman William Jance, and rookies Freddie Webb and Basilio Go, faced the Jose Rizal Heavy Bombers in the championship round at the Araneta Coliseum. They finally clinched the championship, thanks to Basilio Go's game-winning jumper from the free throw area to win the game, 75-73, thus ending a ten-year title drought. The 1960 champion team was coached by Bibiano Ouano, former Ateneo Blue Eagle and member of the 1936 Summer Olympics men's basketball team. Later in 1966, the Knights, coached by Nilo Verona and were led by Larry Albano, Nemie Villegas, Augusto Fermin, and Eddie Reyes, beat the much taller Heavy Bombers for the championship. In the 1970 season, the Knights, led by Molet and Ricky Pineda, Rudy Hines and bigman Dave Regullano, beat the De La Salle Green Archers, for the championship.

In 1979, two sides from the Intramuros district of Manila, the oldest part of the city, battled one another in the championship round of the tournament. The so-called 'Battle of Intramuros' saw the Letran Knights and the Mapua Cardinals face off for the championship. Coached by the legendary Nemie Villegas, and led by Most Valuable Player (MVP) Ramon San Juan, shooting forward Angelito "Itoy" Esguerra, spitfire Pedrito "Bong" Aninon, Timoteo "Tim" Coloso, Nonito "Nonie" Robles, and team captain Ed Baldomero, the Knights defeated the Leo Isaac-led Cardinals to take home the school's 6th championship.

In 1980, hooliganism again marred the league. Fans of the Letran Knights, hoping for a back-to-back winning season, and the fans of the De La Salle Green Archers, got involved in a large brawl inside the Rizal Memorial Sports Complex. The BAP ordered the game to be re-played but the NCAA Policy Board decided to cancel the whole tournament. Letran was suspended from all events because of its participation in the brawl, and got reinstated in 1981.

Early 80s: Samboy Lim era and the first three-peat 
The Letran Knights started the 1982 season under the tutelage of new coach Larry Albano which featured a very exciting player named Avelino "Samboy" Lim, a product of San Beda's high school program. After sweeping the first round, the Knights continued to pile up victories in the second round and was two wins ahead of second-ranked San Sebastian Stags. The Knights were unofficially crowned champions but they still had to play Trinity College in a no-bearing game to officially finish their NCAA campaign. The Knights lost that game 102-89 but it didn't matter as the school's 7th title was still presented to them.

In 1983, Samboy Lim and the Knights advanced to the championship round where they will meet Nani Demegillo and the San Sebastian Stags for the title. The championship game was decided on a best-of-3 series and both teams split the first two games but in Game 3 the Knights played inspired basketball thanks to Samboy Lim's heroic deed of choosing to play instead of resting in his hospital bed due to an asthma attack prior to the game, and captured their second straight championship. Romy Ang was named MVP of the season. With San Beda taking a leave of absence in 1984, the NCAA kicked off the season with only five schools participating and the Knights become the first school to finish the season undefeated and champions. Samboy Lim was named MVP of the season.

Late 80s: second back-to-back 
In 1985, hopes for a rare four-peat vanished as the Knights succumbed to the Stags in the Finals as they lost five of its key players, notable of which was Samboy Lim.

In 1986, Letran won the 2nd round eliminations to arrange a championship match again with the defending champions San Sebastian, led by "Mr. Excitement" Paul Alvarez, for the third time in five years. The Knights were coached by Eddie Reyes and bannered by Fernando "Dong" Libed, Arthur Ayson, Cayetano Salazar, Jing Ruiz, Robert Ruiz, and Justino Pinat. Letran won the series in three games.

In 1987, the Letran Knights swept the 2nd round eliminations to secure a spot again in the Finals to face their rivals San Sebastian Stags in a best-of-three series. The Stags won Game 1 via Eugene Quilban and Napoleon Hatton's heroics. In Game 2, Letran found an unlikely hero in rookie Erwin Santos to secure the win. Letran finally won the series in three games, 63-62, highlighted by a game-winning fadeaway jumper by Dong Libed at the buzzer, making the whole Letran gallery erupted in jubilation and spilled the court.

The 1990s: three more titles 
In 1992, Letran won the 2nd round of the eliminations and the right to face the 1st round winners San Sebastian Stags in a best-of-three Finals. Led by season MVP Robert "Joy" Peña, Gilbert Castillo, and Wilmon Yu, the Knights defeated the Stags in three games. A power outage hit the area with 42 seconds left and Letran students and supporters poured onto the court for an early celebration while waiting for the lights to be restored.

In 1997, the team, bannered by Willie Miller and then-rookie Kerby Raymundo, went on to the Final Four. They beat Mapua in the first round of the step-ladder, but got eliminated by San Beda in the 2nd round.

In 1998, the Knights, led by Kerby Raymundo and season MVP Chris Calaguio, and now coached by Louie Alas, faced the sixth-peat seeking Stags in the Finals. Letran won the series via Nicholas Pacheco's game-winning three point shot to capture their 13th championship. Louie Alas then left the team to coach the Philippines men's national basketball team in the 1999 SEA Games in Brunei.

During the 1999 season, the Letran Knights were mentored by Binky Favis. History was made when the Letran Knights became the first team ranked fourth to beat a number one ranked team, the San Sebastian Stags, in the semi-finals that year. The Letran Knights went to the best-of-three Finals to face the JRC Heavy Bombers, led by Ernani Epondulan and Ariel Capus. Letran won Game 1 via Aldin Ayo's late-game layup. During the 2nd game with only 3 minutes remaining, Letran's John Paul Prior and JRC's John Dale Valena got into a fistfight on the court, causing the crowd from both sides to throw all sorts of debris onto the playing court thus delaying the game, and later triggering a brawl that reached outside the ULTRA stadium. JRC officials then decided to concede the game with Letran leading 83-60, thus gave the championship to the Knights. Kerby Raymundo was named season and Finals MVP.

2000s: return of Louie Alas 
From the 2000 to 2002 seasons, the Letran Knights struggled as they underwent a rebuilding process. In 2002, former mentor Louie Alas came back as the head coach of the Knights after his stints in Manila Metrostars in the MBA, and the Mobiline Phone Pals in the PBA.

The 2003 series culminated with a play-off between the Letran Knights and the hosts, the San Sebastian Stags, who had won the previous two championships. The Knights, led by Ronjay Enrile, were aiming to break Ateneo de Manila University's record of 14 titles. The series reached a deciding third game. In the final minutes, Boyet Bautista, Aaron Aban and Jonathan Piñera ignited an 8–0 run, turning a 56–58 deficit into a 64–58 title-clinching victory. Ronjay Enrile was voted as NCAA Finals MVP.

Emerging at the end of the elimination round during the 2004 season with a 9–5 standing, the Letran Knights faced, in the Final Four tournament, a Philippine Christian University Dolphins bannered by Jayson Castro, Gabby Espinas, Beau Belga, and Rob Sanz, who had a 10–4 standing and a twice-to-beat advantage. The match was forced to a deciding game, but Aban and Enrile both split their free throws in the 4th quarter and the game went into overtime. The Dolphins went on to win their first NCAA title against the season host, UPHSD Altas.

In the 2005 season, the Knights and the defending champions Dolphins faced each other again in the playoffs, this time in the best-of-three Finals series. The Dolphins shocked the Knights as they emerged as winners in Game 1. The Knights, however, won Game 2 to force a deciding game led by John Paul Alcaraz. The deciding game was won by the Knights, with Boyet Bautista winning Finals MVP honors. Louie Alas won his third NCAA title and was awarded Coach of the Year.

In the 2006 season, the Knights had a 6-0 start but were beaten by San Beda in the first round finale. The Knights won several more games, but with losses to eventual semifinalists Mapua, PCU, and San Beda in their last three elimination round games, they were forced to face-off with PCU. The Knights lost this game and went on to lose another in the final four, finishing second runner-up. Letran Knight Boyet Bautista won the Most Improved Player award.

Louie Alas described the 2007 season as a "rebuilding" season, with Boyet Bautista and Aaron Aban leaving the team after being drafted into the Philippine Basketball Association. The Philippine Christian University Dolphins were suspended, leaving only 7 teams in the competition. The Letran Knights won their first four games before losing to the hosts, the JRU Heavy Bombers. They went on to defeat the San Beda Red Lions, who until then had been unbeaten, and so finished on top after the first round. The team was beaten by Mapua and San Beda in the second round, but still finished second. They defeated the Heavy Bombers in the semifinals but lost to San Beda Red Lions in the Finals.

In 2008 season, Letran won the first six games of the season, including a come-from-behind win against UPHSD, but faltered in the first round finale against San Beda. In the elimination round finale, Letran was on the verge of winning a twice-to-beat advantage but a game went into overtime. In the extra period, Letran was leading by 4 points when San Beda rallied to lead by two. RJ Jazul scored on a driving lay-up with 5 seconds remaining but Borgie Hermida scored a buzzer-beater with a looper from the free-throw line to seal San Beda's third straight semifinal appearance with the twice to beat advantage. After San Beda's win against Letran, four teams, including the Knights, were tied from 2nd to 5th, with only 4 teams advancing to the semifinals. Letran defeated Mapua, 62-52, in the classification round and managed to qualify for the second-seed playoff game against JRU. But JRU defeated Letran and the former clinched the second-seed and twice-to-beat advantage. The two teams meet again in the semi-finals, but still Letran lost.

In 2009, the Knights were still led by RJ Jazul and Rey Guevarra, who were on their final year of eligibility. Joining them was the former Letran Squire star, Kevin Alas. On their last elimination game, San Beda had an easy win against Letran, but not before Rey Guevarra was injured after a bad fall in a collision with San Beda's Sudan Daniel. Guevarra would be ruled out for the rest of the season with an anterior cruciate ligament (ACL) injury. Letran garnered a fourth-place finish and allowing themselves to qualify in the Final four where they faced, and still lost, to San Beda.

2010–2012: rebuilding and end of Louie Alas era 
In 2010, the Knights failed to advance to the Final 4 for the second time in the Louie Alas era but 2 weeks after the tournament they started their preparation for Season 87.

In 2011 the team was joined by Kevin Racal, JRU transferees Joel Gabriel and Carlo Lituania, and spitfire point guard Mark Cruz and Zyron Cudal from the Letran Squires program. From 5th place the previous year, the Knights cruised to the Final 4 as the #3 seed and faced the #2 seed San Sebastian Stags. They beat the Stags in the first game to force a do-or-die game but eventually lost in the second game. Kevin Alas and Raymond Almazan were named to the Mythical 5 and Almazan also bagged the Defensive Player of the Year award.

The 2012 season was a roller coaster ride for the Knights as they start the season sinking down as far as the 6th spot and it didn't stop there as star center Raymond Almazan was missing a lot of games in the first round due to unknown reasons. Almazan vowed to come back in the 2nd round and with him back in the lineup, the Knights became the hottest team in the NCAA as they won 7 of their 9 games just enough to secure the #3 spot to force a Final 4 rematch against San Sebastian. In the first game Kevin Alas made history as he scored 43 points, breaking former CSB Blazers star Sunday Salvacion's previous record of 39 points in 2001, to force a knockout game. In the do-or-die game, the game went down to the wire but Jojo Belorio made sure it will be Letran this time by scoring the game winning free throws to book the last ticket to the Finals. They met San Beda in the finals. They were lost in the first game, but avoided defeat in the second game. In Game 3 they were blown out by the Red Lions. A month later after the tournament, longtime head coach Louie Alas resigned.

2013–2019: coaching changes and back to championship form 
In 2013, Letran hired then-Rain or Shine Elasto Painters assistant coach Caloy Garcia as their new head coach, replacing long-time mentor Louie Alas. Joining the team are UPHSD transferee Franz Dysam and former NCAA Season 87 juniors MVP Rey Nambatac from their juniors program. Letran went again to the finals but still lost to San Beda in three games. Raymond Almazan was named season MVP and Defensive Player of the Year.

In 2014, the team added former Letran squire and NCAA Season 88 juniors MVP John Quinto. With the departure of Raymond Almazan to the pros, the Knights struggled to enter the Final Four with a 9-9 record. After the tournament, Caloy Garcia parted ways with the Knights. Letran officials then named former Letran Knights player Aldin Ayo as the new head coach.

In 2015, Letran officials named Filipino boxing icon Manny Pacquiao as their new team manager. The Knights finally ended its ten-year title drought as they captured their 17th NCAA men's basketball championship by beating San Beda in three games. Mark Cruz was named NCAA Finals MVP. Just weeks after leading the Knights to a championship, Aldin Ayo left Letran to coach the De La Salle Green Archers in the UAAP citing personal reasons.

The following year, Letran officials formally named then-NU Bullpups coach Jeff Napa as the new head coach of the Knights. However they struggled to enter the Final Four for two seasons.

In 2018, SMC Sports director Alfrancis Chua was named as the Knights' Special Assistant to the Rector for Sports Development. The Knights also added transferees Fran Yu and Edson Batiller from UE, and Larry Muyang from La Salle. They finally barged into the Final Four, but they were eliminated by Lyceum. John Quinto was named as one of the Mythical Five, while Larry Muyang bags Rookie of the Year award.

In 2019, coach Jeff Napa formally part ways with Letran after his three-year contract. A month later, former longtime Lyceum Pirates head coach and then-NorthPort Batang Pier team manager Bonnie Tan formally announced as the new head coach of the Knights. After the elimination rounds, Letran finished third place, thus securing a spot in the Final Four. Letran then eliminated San Sebastian and Lyceum via the step-ladder format and entered the Finals, where they faced the unbeaten and defending champion San Beda and defeat them in three games to capture their 18th NCAA championship. Fran Yu was named NCAA Finals MVP and Most Improved Player. After the team's bonfire celebration, Jeff Napa returned to Letran as a team consultant.

2020–present: COVID-19 pandemic and second three-peat 
The whole NCAA league suffered a setback when the Philippines was hit by the COVID-19 pandemic in 2020, thus suspending the 95th season to an indefinite halt. In that year, UST Growling Tigers players Rhenz Abando, Brent Paraiso, and Ira Bataller formally transferred to Letran. When the NCAA men's basketball finally resumed in the second semester of the academic year 2021-22, the Knights finished the elimination round at first place with an unblemished record. Letran then eliminated UPHSD and entered the Finals and faced their Intramuros neighbors the Mapúa Cardinals and defeat them in two games to successfully defend and capture their 19th basketball title. Team captain Jeo Ambohot was named NCAA Finals MVP, NCAA All-Defensive Team, and a Mythical Five member, while Rhenz Abando became the 11th Letran Knight to capture the Season MVP award. Abando also bagged the Rookie of the Year award and was also named in the Mythical Five.

After leading the Knights to the NCAA Season 97 title, Rhenz Abando decided to forego his final playing year to pursue his basketball career as a professional player. Abando then signed with the Anyang KGC of the Korean Basketball League. Even without the presence of their MVP, the Knights, still bannered by team captain Fran Yu, Louie Sangalang, and Brent Paraiso, successfully defended and captured its 20th NCAA basketball championship, and their third consecutive title, by beating the number one seeded Benilde Blazers in three games. King Caralipio was named the Finals MVP and also named in the Mythical Five.

Roster

Season-by-season records

Pre-Final Four era

Final Four era 

Notes:

Notable players

NCAA Individual awards 
Most Valuable Player
Lauro Mumar - 1950
Alex Marquez - 1975
Ramon San Juan - 1979
Jerry Gonzales - 1982
Romeo Ang - 1983
Samboy Lim - 1984
Ronald Peña - 1992
Chris Calaguio - 1998
Kerby Raymundo - 1999
Raymond Almazan - 2013
Rhenz Abando - 2021

Finals MVP
Gilbert Castillo - 1992
Kerby Raymundo - 1999
Ronjay Enrile - 2003
Boyet Bautista - 2005
Mark Cruz - 2015
Fran Yu - 2019
Jeo Ambohot - 2021
King Caralipio - 2022

Rookie of the Year
Willie Miller - 1996
Kerby Raymundo - 1997
Ismael Junio - 2001
Larry Muyang - 2018
Rhenz Abando - 2021

Mythical Five
Chris Calaguio - 1998
Kerby Raymundo - 1998, 1999
Orlan Tama - 2000
Harold Santa Cruz - 2002
Ronjay Enrile - 2003
Bryan Faundo - 2007
Dino Daa - 2007
Kevin Alas - 2011, 2012
Raymond Almazan - 2011, 2013
Rhenz Abando - 2021
Jeo Ambohot - 2021
King Caralipio - 2022

Knights in the Pros 
Bold denotes active player.

Philippine Basketball Association 

Samboy Lim (San Miguel)
Cayetano Salazar (Ginebra)
Rino Salazar (Toyota)
Itoy Esguerra (Crispa)
Rudy Hines (U-Tex)
Molet Pineda (U-Tex)
Art Ayson (Purefoods)
Tim Coloso (Toyota)
Estelito Espiritu (Shell)
Jing Ruiz (Shell)
Freddie Webb (YCO Tanduay)
Romy Marcelo (Toyota)
Anton Villoria (Red Bull)
Paul Guerrero (Purefoods)
Dong Polistco (San Miguel / Alaska)
Ed Ducut (Ginebra)
Romy Ang (Presto / Shell)
Gilbert Castillo (San Miguel/Purefoods / Red Bull)
Billy Moody (San Miguel)

Chris Calaguio (Shell/San Miguel)
Willie Miller (Alaska/Red Bull/Ginebra/TNT)
Kerby Raymundo (Purefoods/Ginebra)
Allan Salangsang (Ginebra)
Eric Rodriguez (Air21)
Aaron Aban (Talk n Text)
Boyet Bautista (Purefoods)
Mark Andaya (Red Bull)
Rey Guevarra (Meralco)
RJ Jazul (Alaska/Phoenix Super LPG)
Bryan Faundo (Alaska / Converge)
Kevin Alas (NLEX)
Kevin Racal (Alaska / Converge)
Raymond Almazan (Rain or Shine/Meralco)
Rey Nambatac (Rain or Shine)
Mark Cruz (Purefoods / Blackwater)
Jerrick Balanza (Ginebra/NorthPort)
Christian Balagasay (Terrafirma)
JP Calvo (Terrafirma)

Bonbon Batiller (Terrafirma)
Larry Muyang (Phoenix Super LPG)
Rey Publico (Blackwater)
Ato Ular (Blackwater)
Allen Mina (Terrafirma)

Maharlika Pilipinas Basketball League 

Jaypee Belencion (GenSan OKBet Warriors)
Mark Cruz (GenSan OKBet Warriors)
Felix Apreku (Valenzuela XUR Homes Realty Inc.)

ASEAN Basketball League 

Mark Andaya (Philippine Patriots)
Eric Rodriguez (AirAsia Philippine Patriots)
Allan Salangsang (AirAsia Philippine Patriots)
Aaron Aban (San Miguel Alab Pilipinas)
Joshua De Villa (Hong Kong Eastern Long Lions)

Korean Basketball League 

Rhenz Abando (Anyang KGC)

Notes:

Knights in the national team 

 Lauro Mumar – 1948 Olympian, 1951 Asian Games gold medalist, 1954 FIBA World Championship bronze medalist, 1954 Asian Games gold medalist

 Felicisimo Fajardo – 1948 Olympian
 Florentino Bautista – 1952 Olympian
 Freddie Webb – 1972 Olympian
 David Regullano – 1973 ABC Championship gold medalist
 Samboy Lim – 1985 William Jones Cup gold medalist, 1986 Asian Games Bronze medalist, 1990 Asian Games Silver medalist and Mythical Five selection
 Robert Ruiz – 1988 RP Youth
 Kerby Raymundo – 1999 SEA Games gold medalist,  Philippine team member 2007 FIBA Asia Championship and 2009 FIBA Asia Championship
 Willie Miller –  Philippine team member 2009 FIBA Asia Championship
 Eric Rodriguez – 2007 SEA games gold medalist
 Boyet Bautista – 2007 SEA games gold medalist
 Allan Salangsang – 2007 SEA games gold medalist
 Rey Guevarra – member Smart-Gilas 1.0
 RJ Jazul – member Smart-Gilas 1.0
 Raymond Almazan – 2017 SEABA gold medalist, Philippine team member 2017 FIBA Asia Cup and 2019 FIBA World Cup
 Kevin Alas – 2013 SEA Games gold medalist, 2014 FIBA Asia Cup bronze medalist
 Rey Nambatac – 2012 SEABA Under-18 gold medalist
 Fran Yu – 2016 SEABA Under-18 gold medalist, Philippine team member 2016 FIBA Asia Under-18 Championship
 Rhenz Abando – Philippine team member 2023 FIBA Basketball World Cup qualification (Asia) and 2022 FIBA Asia Cup

Honors 

 Championships:
 NCAA (20): 1938, 1950, 1960, 1966, 1970, 1979, 1982, 1983, 1984, 1986, 1987, 1992, 1998, 1999, 2003, 2005 2015, 2019, 2021, 2022

References 

Former Philippine Basketball League teams
National Collegiate Athletic Association (Philippines) basketball teams
Colegio de San Juan de Letran